Wife carrying is a contest in which male competitors race while each carrying a female partner. The objective is for the male to carry the female through a special obstacle track in the fastest time. The sport was first introduced at Sonkajärvi, Finland.

Several types of carrying may be practised: either a classic piggyback, a fireman's carry (over the shoulder), or Estonian-style (wife upside-down on his back with her legs over the neck and shoulders).

History

Eukonkanto originated in Finland. Tales have been passed down of a man named Herkko Rosvo-Ronkainen (aka Ronkainen the Robber). This man was thought to be a robber in the late 1800s who lived in a forest. He supposedly ran around with his gang of thieves causing harm to villagers. From what has been found, there are three ideas as to why/how this sport was invented. Firstly, that Rosvo-Ronkainen and his thieves were accused of stealing food and abducting women from villages in the area he lived in, then carrying these women on their backs as they ran away (hence the "wife" or woman carrying). The second suggestion is that young men would go to neighbouring villages, and abduct women to forcibly marry, often women who were already married. These wives were also carried on the backs of the young men; this was referred to as “the practice of wife stealing". Lastly, is the idea that Rosvo-Ronkainen trained his thieves to be "faster and stronger" by carrying big, heavy sacks on their backs, from which this sport evolved. Though the sport is often considered a joke, competitors take it very seriously, just like any other sport.

Wife carrying contests have taken place in Australia, the United States, Hong Kong, India, Germany, the UK and other parts of the world besides Finland and nearby Sweden, Estonia and Latvia, and the sport has a category in the Guinness Book of Records.

Rules 

The original course was a rough, rocky terrain with fences and brooks, but it has been altered to suit modern conditions. There is now sand instead of full rocks, fences, and some kind of area filled with water (a pool). These are the following rules set by the International Wife Carrying Competition Rules Committee:
 The length of the official track is 253.5 metres.
 The track has two dry obstacles and a water obstacle about one metre deep.
 The wife to be carried may be your own, or the neighbour's, or you may have found her further afield; she must, however, be over 17 years of age.
 The minimum weight of the wife to be carried is 49 kilograms. If she weighs less than 49 kg, she will be burdened with a rucksack containing additional weight to bring the total load to be carried up to 49 kg.
 All participants must enjoy themselves.
 The only equipment allowed is a belt worn by the carrier and a helmet worn by the carried.
 The contestants run the race two pairs at a time, so each heat is a contest in itself.
 Each contestant takes care of his/her safety and, if deemed necessary, insurance.
 The contestants have to pay attention to the instructions given by the organizers of the competition.
 There is only one category in the World Championships, and the winner is the couple who completes the course in the shortest time.
 Also, the most entertaining couple, the best costume, and the strongest carrier will be awarded a special prize.
While the International rules are the basis for all competitions, rules and prizes do vary for each competition.

The Wife Carrying World Championships have been held annually in Sonkajärvi, Finland, since 1992 (where the prize is the wife's weight in beer).

World champions

 2022 – Taisto Miettinen (Finland) and Katja Kovanen (Finland), 67.4 seconds.
 2021 - Event not held 
 2020 - Event not held
 2019 - Vytautas Kirkliauskas (Lithuania) and Neringa Kirkliauskiene (Lithuania), 66.7 seconds.
 2018 - Vytautas Kirkliauskas (Lithuania) and Neringa Kirkliauskiene (Lithuania), 65.1 seconds.
 2017 – Taisto Miettinen (Finland) and Kristiina Haapanen (Finland), 68.6 seconds.
 2016 – Dmitry Sagal (Russia) and Anastasia Loginova (Russia), 62.7 seconds.
 2015 – Ville Parviainen (Finland) and Sari Viljanen (Finland), 62.7 seconds.
 2014 – Ville Parviainen (Finland) and Janette Oksman (Finland), 63.7 seconds.
 2013 – Taisto Miettinen (Finland) and Kristiina Haapanen (Finland), 65.0 seconds.
 2012 – Taisto Miettinen (Finland) and Kristiina Haapanen (Finland), 61.2 seconds.
 2011 – Taisto Miettinen (Finland) and Kristiina Haapanen (Finland), 60.7 seconds.
 2010 – Taisto Miettinen (Finland) and Kristiina Haapanen (Finland), 64.9 seconds.
 2009 – Taisto Miettinen (Finland) and Kristiina Haapanen (Finland), 62.0 seconds.
 2008 – Alar Voogla (Estonia) and Kirsti Viltrop (Estonia), 61.9 seconds.
 2007 – Madis Uusorg (Estonia) and Inga Klauso (Estonia), 61.7 seconds.
 2006 – Margo Uusorg (Estonia) and Sandra Kullas (Estonia), 56.9 seconds.
 2005 – Margo Uusorg (Estonia) and Egle Soll (Estonia), 59.1 seconds.
 2004 – Madis Uusorg (Estonia) and Inga Klauso (Estonia), 65.3 seconds.
 2003 – Margo Uusorg (Estonia) and Egle Soll (Estonia), 60.7 seconds.
 2002 – Meelis Tammre (Estonia) and Anne Zillberberg (Estonia), 63.8 seconds.
 2001 – Margo Uusorg (Estonia) and Birgit Ulrich (Estonia), 55.6 seconds.
 2000 – Margo Uusorg (Estonia) and Birgit Ulrich (Estonia), 55.5 seconds.
 1999 – Imre Ambos (Estonia) and Annela Ojaste (Estonia), 64.5 seconds.
 1998 – Imre Ambos (Estonia) and Annela Ojaste (Estonia), 69.2 seconds.
 1997 – Jouni Jussila (Finland) and Tiina Jussila (Finland), 65.0 seconds.

Countries

Australia
Australian Wife Carrying Championships have been held annually since 2005.
 2016 – Australian Champions: Adrian and Amanda Betts
 2013 – South Bank, Brisbane
 2008 – in Singleton, NSW
 2007 – Australian Champions: Anthony Partridge and Angela Moore

North American 
The North American Wife Carrying Championships takes place every year since 1999 on Columbus Day Weekend in October at Sunday River Ski Resort in Newry, Maine.

 2022 - Caleb Roesler and Justine Roesler 
 2021 – Olivia and Jerome Roehm (Delaware)
 2020 – Olivia and Jerome Roehm (Delaware)
 2019 – Olivia and Jerome Roehm (Delaware)
 2018 – Jesse Wall and Christine Arsenault (Maine)
 2017 – Jake and Kirsten Barney (Virginia)
 2016 – Elliot and Giana Storey (Maine)

United Kingdom 
The United Kingdom Wife Carrying Race was established in 2008, though the "sport" is claimed to have taken place "with help from our Scandinavian cousins" for around 1200 years from 793AD when Viking raiders raided villages and abducted wives.

 2008 - Joel Hicks carrying Wendy Cook
 2009 - Matt Evans carrying Jatinder Gill (the prize was their combined weight in beer - 120 kg)
 2010 - John Lund carrying Rosa Fenwick
 2011 - Sam Trowbridge carrying Nathalie
 2012 - Tom Wilmot carrying Kirsty Wilmot
 2013 - Mike Witko carrying Lindsey Finn (Mike went on to take 3rd place carrying Hattie Archer in the World Championships in Finland)
 2014 - Rich Blake Smith carrying Anna
 2015 - Jonathon Schwochert carrying Charlotte Xiong (this race also saw Joel Hicks carrying "Tiny Tina" a male friend in drag who was 7'4" and 22 stone)
 2016 - Jonathan Schwochert carrying Charlotte Xiong (this race saw Joel Hicks carrying two wives simultaneously but coming last)
 2017 - Jack McKendrick carrying Kirsty Jones 
 2018 - Chris Hepworth carrying Tanisha Prince
 2019 - Chris Hepworth carrying Tanisha Prince
 2020 - Mark Threlfall carrying Cassie Yates
 2021 - Event not held
 2022 - Alex Bone carrying Millie Barnham

United States 
The US final takes place on the second weekend of July in Menahga Minnesota (MN-St. Urho Wife Carry for Charity Challenge).
Major wife-carrying competitions are also held in Monona, Wisconsin, Minocqua, Wisconsin and Marquette, Michigan.

Asia
Ecorun India, a society for creating environmental awareness organized Wife Carrying Race in Thiruvananthapuram, Kerala, India, Asia on 1 January 2011. The event is called "Bhaaryaasametham" roughly translated as 'with your wife' in Malayalam, the local language. The society plans on conducting more such events every year in India.  Wife carrying in Asia is also called matukinina.

A Bollywood movie named Dum Laga Ke Haisha had "wife carrying race" in its backdrop.

In popular culture
 North American champions Ehrin and April Armstrong were featured as guests on a first-season episode of GSN's revival of I've Got a Secret.
 BBC Presenters Mike Bushell and Steph McGovern reversed the roles when they took part in the UK annual wife-carrying competition in 2013, she carried him. The male presenter said this was a first.
 Margo Uusorg and Sandra Kullas hold the world record time for this competition, finishing the 253.5-metre course in 56.9 seconds in 2006.
The main characters in the 2018 film Father of the Year enter (and win) a wife-carrying contest.

See also
 Cheese rolling
 Idiotarod
 Kinetic sculpture race
 Wok racing
 Zoobomb
 Bog snorkelling
 Sepak takraw

References

External links

 Sonkajärvi – Wife Carrying World Championships
 Wife carrying competition in the UK

Racing
Novelty running
Sport in Finland
Individual sports
Obstacle racing
Recurring sporting events established in 1992
Sports originating in Finland
1992 establishments in Finland